Crown Feral is the fifth and final studio album by the American grindcore band Trap Them. It was released in 2016 through Prosthetic Records.

Track listing

Personnel
Trap Them
 Brian Izzi – guitar
 Galen Baudhuin – bass
 Brad Fickeisen – drums
 Ryan McKenney – vocals

References

Trap Them albums
2016 albums
Prosthetic Records albums
Albums produced by Kurt Ballou